Chadeh (also Romanized as Chādeh; also known as Chahār Deh and Chārdeh) is a village in Afriz Rural District, Sedeh District, Qaen County, South Khorasan Province, Iran. At the 2006 census, its population was 96, in 22 families.

References 

Populated places in Qaen County